Arband may refer to:
 Arband, Razavi Khorasan
 Arband, Zanjan